Duékoué Department is a department of Guémon Region in Montagnes District, Ivory Coast. In 2021, its population was 420,911 and its seat is the settlement of Duékoué. The sub-prefectures of the department are Bagohouo, Duékoué, Gbapleu, Guéhiébly, and Guézon.

History
Duékoué Department was created in 1988 as a first-level subdivision via a split-off from Guiglo Department.

In 1997, regions were introduced as new first-level subdivisions of Ivory Coast; as a result, all departments were converted into second-level subdivisions. Duékoué Department was initially included in Dix-Huit Montagnes Region, but in 2000 it was transferred to the newly created Moyen-Cavally Region.

In 2011, districts were introduced as new first-level subdivisions of Ivory Coast. At the same time, regions were reorganised and became second-level subdivisions and all departments were converted into third-level subdivisions. At this time, Duékoué Department became part of Guémon Region in Montagnes District.

Notes

Departments of Guémon
1988 establishments in Ivory Coast
States and territories established in 1988